St. Xavier’s High School, Nashik, is a private Catholic primary and secondary school located in the Nashik Road suburb of Nashik, Maharashtra, India. The school was founded by the Society of Jesus (Jesuits) in 1961. Students of all religions, races, and languages are admitted. The school comprises standards one through ten and prepares students for the Secondary School Certificate examination through Maharashtra State Board.

See also

 List of Jesuit schools
 List of schools in Maharashtra
 Violence against Christians in India

References  

Jesuit secondary schools in India
Jesuit primary schools in India
High schools and secondary schools in Maharashtra
Christian schools in Maharashtra
Schools in Nashik
Educational institutions established in 1961
1961 establishments in Maharashtra